"Cancioncitas de Amor" (English: "Little Songs of Love") is a song written and performed by American singer Romeo Santos. It was released as the third single for his second studio album Formula, Vol. 2 on February 11, 2014.

Charts and certifications

Weekly charts

Year-end charts

Certifications

References

2014 singles
Bachata songs
Romeo Santos songs
Songs written by Romeo Santos
Spanish-language songs
Sony Music Latin singles
2014 songs
Number-one singles in the Dominican Republic